Five ships of the United States Navy have borne the name Alert.  During World War I, three ships held the name simultaneously.

 USS Alert (1812), was an 18-gun sloop-of-war captured from the United Kingdom in the War of 1812 that was sold in 1829 for breaking up.
 , was a screw tug used during the Civil War.
 , was a screw steamer in use during the late 19th century and World War I.
 , was a steam launch acquired from the Coast Guard during World War I.
 , was used as a patrol boat during World War I.

Seven cutters of the United States Coast Guard have borne the name Alert.

  A schooner homeported at Eastport, Maine. 75 ton displacement.
  A schooner built to replace built to replace Alert (1818). 120 ton displacement.
  A centerboard sloop used for life saving duty at Tom's River, New Jersey. 10 ton displacement.
  A steam launch  originally homeported at Mobile, Alabama. 19 ton displacement.
  A steam harbor tug replacing Alert (1901) at Mobile, Alabama. 35 ton displacement.
  An Active-class cutter, commissioned as WSC-127, homeported at various stations in California.
 , a Reliance-class cutter.

References

Bibliography
 
 
 

United States Navy ship names